Fred Vinson (born April 2, 1977) is a former American football cornerback.
He is the cousin of National Football League (NFL) safety Corey Chavous and is also related to Barney Chavous, former defensive end/defensive tackle for the Denver Broncos.

High school & college 
When he was ten years old, Vinson competed in the Utah Junior Olympics, where his 40-yard dash time was 2/100ths behind the national best. He attended North Augusta High School, where he was an All-Area and All-Conference selection after recording ninety-nine tackles as a senior. He attended Vanderbilt University, where he played every game as a freshman, starting one and garnering thirty tackles. The following season, he won a full-time starting job and had a career-high fifty-three tackles, thirty-nine of them solo. In 1997, his total increased to forty-eight tackles, with forty-four of them solo. He began his senior season as the starter for Vanderbilt, but was injured in an early contest, forcing him to miss the rest of the season.

Pro career 
Despite the injury, Vinson was selected in the second round with the 47th overall selection in the 1999 NFL Draft by the Green Bay Packers. He played as a nickelback and had nineteen tackles and two interceptions. After one season with the Packers, he was traded to the Seattle Seahawks for running back Ahman Green and a fifth-round draft pick. Vinson suffered a torn ACL during the preseason in a pickup basketball game and was forced to miss the season. After another injury the following offseason, he was released. He attempted a comeback with the Carolina Panthers, but did not a play a game.

He played in the Arena Football League with the Carolina Cobras. He had eighteen tackles, but did not play in the league again following the folding of the Cobras.

Career statistics
Source:

Post-Football Career 
Fred Vinson is the founder of WebID and LocalOrganicRankings.com.

References

External links 
 Arena Football League Stats

1977 births
Living people
People from North Augusta, South Carolina
Players of American football from South Carolina
American football defensive backs
Vanderbilt Commodores football players
Green Bay Packers players
Seattle Seahawks players
Carolina Cobras players